The 1987 Cleveland Browns season was the team's 38th season in the National Football League.

Led by another 3,000-yard season from Bernie Kosar, the Browns captured their third-straight AFC Central crown. In the divisional playoffs, against the Indianapolis Colts at Municipal Stadium, the Browns routed the Colts 38–21 to advance to their second-straight AFC Championship Game. For the second year in a row, the Browns were matched up against the Denver Broncos for a trip to Super Bowl XXII. The Browns fell behind early at Mile High Stadium, as the Broncos roared out to a big halftime lead. However, the Browns scored 30 points in the second half, and drove down the field in the late fourth quarter with a chance to score a game-tying touchdown. With 1:12 left in the game, RB Earnest Byner was stripped of the ball at the 2-yard line by Broncos' defensive back Jeremiah Castille in a play since dubbed The Fumble. Denver ran down the clock and took an intentional safety with 8 seconds left, and the Browns fell 38–33. Denver returned to the Super Bowl for a second straight year at the expense of the Browns.

Offseason

NFL draft

Personnel

Staff

NFL replacement players
After the league decided to use replacement players during the NFLPA strike, the following team was assembled:

Roster

Schedule

Regular season

Note: Intra-division opponents are in bold text.

Game Summaries

Week 9: vs. Atlanta

Postseason

AFC Divisional Game

AFC Championship Game

Standings

References

External links 
 1987 Cleveland Browns at Pro Football Reference (Profootballreference.com)
 1987 Cleveland Browns Statistics at jt-sw.com
 1987 Cleveland Browns Schedule at jt-sw.com
 1987 Cleveland Browns at DatabaseFootball.com  

Cleveland
Cleveland Browns seasons
AFC Central championship seasons
Cleveland Browns